Noctueliopsis rhodoxanthinalis is a moth in the family Crambidae. It was described by Eugene G. Munroe in 1974. It is found in North America, where it has been recorded from Texas.

References

Moths described in 1974
Odontiini